Davis Ice Piedmont is an ice piedmont about  long and  wide, located along the north side of Missen Ridge on the north coast of Victoria Land, Antarctica. The name Cape Davis, after John E. Davis, Second Master of the Terror, was given to a cape in the immediate area by Captain James C. Ross in 1841. Since no significant cape exists here, the Advisory Committee on Antarctic Names and the New Zealand Antarctic Place-Names Committee have reapplied the name "Davis" to this ice piedmont. The geographical feature lies situated on the Pennell Coast, a portion of Antarctica lying between Cape Williams and Cape Adare.

References

See also
Nella Island

Ice piedmonts of Antarctica
Landforms of Victoria Land
Pennell Coast